Berndt Andersson (born 12 November 1951) is a Swedish sprint canoer who competed from the early 1970s to the early 1980s. Competing in three Summer Olympics, he earned his best finish of sixth in the K-1 1000 m event at Montreal in 1976. He came 5th in Munich 1972 and 9th in Moscow 1980.

References

Sports-reference.com profile

1951 births
Canoeists at the 1972 Summer Olympics
Canoeists at the 1976 Summer Olympics
Canoeists at the 1980 Summer Olympics
Living people
Olympic canoeists of Sweden
Swedish male canoeists